Saejowi (hangul: 새조위), also known as Saejowi Initiative for National Integration (hangul: 새롭고 하나된 조국을 위한 모임), operates in Seoul, South Korea, as a nongovernmental organization (NGO) that assists North Korean defectors with settlement in South Korea. Saejowi sponsors programs that provide medical support, job training, and other educational opportunities in order to aid with defector adjustment to South Korean society. Additionally, Saejowi works to encourage civil involvement in the Korean reunification movement, especially among the defector community. The organization hosts programs that facilitate open communication between South Koreans and defectors from North Korea. It has previously worked with the Korean Ministry of Unification, Korea Hana Foundation, and the Community Chest of Korea.

History
Saejowi was first established on October 15, 1988, by Hong, Sa-deok (홍사덕), a former Korean senator and current Acting Representative of the Korean Council for Reconciliation and Cooperation (민족화해협력범국민협의회). Saejowi was founded with the publication of Hong's book "My Dream, My Challenge" (나의 꿈, 나의 도전), which advocates the reconsideration of Korean reunification among South Koreans.

In March 1991 the Korean Ministry of Unification registered Saejowi as a social movement, and in July 2001 Saejowi was officially registered as a nongovernmental organization. The organization's first resettlement support center for North Korean defectors began operations in 2003. Three years later in 2006, Saejowi opened the first medical support center at the National Medical Center. A year later a call center was established in the same location for refugees with medical questions. In the next six years, three other medical counseling centers were opened in the following locations: Chungnam National University Hospital (2009), Incheon Red Cross Hospital (2011), and the Seoul Medical Center (2012).

Beginning in 2007 Saejowi has hosted coaching sessions for North Korean defectors looking to become professional counselors. In 2012, Saejowi began a domestic violence counseling service that focuses on providing women with information regarding self-defense in sexual and domestic violence situations. In 2013 Saejowi celebrated its 25th anniversary with a special international policy forum held in conjunction with the Hanns Seidel Foundation from Berlin, Germany.

Since March 2009 Dr. Shin, Mi-nyeo has been the acting representative of Saejowi.

Medical support
Since its inception in 1988, Saejowi has worked primarily in the medical community, where it has established medical counseling centers for North Korean defectors in four South Korean hospitals. By the end of 2014, Saejowi had provided medical counseling assistance to approximately 7,500 North Korean refugees.

Saejowi's four medical centers were established to provide medical counseling to supplement and explain professional diagnoses and treatments. The organization's counselors are North Korean defectors, so they are able to describe medical recommendations using the North Korean dialect. The medical counseling offered by Saejowi specifically addresses the following situations:  North Korean defectors who arrive in South Korea with untreated physical illness and posttraumatic stress disorder (PTSD), North Korean defectors who are unable to obtain necessary medical treatment because of misunderstandings caused by differences between medical procedures in North and South Korea, and North Korean defectors who experience difficulties understanding medical terms and phrases derived from English and other Western languages.

Job training
In order to help North Korean defectors obtain employment in South Korea, Saejowi provides them with programs that address their physical, psychological, social, and emotional needs. The organization has also created other short-term programs on an as-needed basis, such as a language program initiated in 2010 with the Daewon Foreign Language High School to provide English language training to defectors.

Coaching
Through Saejowi's "Coaching" (코칭) program, North Korean defectors can develop the necessary skills to become licensed as counselors who can provide assistance to other defectors as they utilize the South Korean healthcare system. These classes teach participants how to assist patients as they obtain medical referrals, schedule necessary appointments, receive discharge information, and communicate with medical staff. Counselors also provide defectors with social support by visiting them in the hospital, listening to their concerns, and sharing information regarding life in South Korea. By the end of 2013, 118 North Koreans were certified as counselors, with 59 defectors officially employed in a career related to their counseling training.

Domestic violence counseling

The organization's domestic and sexual violence counseling for North Korean defectors is for defectors who have suffered through abusive family situations. Because many North Koreans believe that their abusive family situations are "normal," they do not seek assistance for domestic violence offenses. Through these counseling sessions Saejowi provides these defectors with the information they need to both recognize and avoid abusive situations.

Home care service
Saejowi's "Home Care Service" (홈케어 서비스) trains defectors in the basics of childcare and household duties. Participants in this program provide home care services to North Korean defectors who lack the financial means to pay for similar services offered by South Korean companies. These household helpers focus on assisting families with single parents needing to work, elderly needing regular hospice care, and sick family members needing medical services.

Educational and Cultural Programs
Saejowi works to educate South Koreans and the global community about the difficulties faced by North Korean defectors. Initially founded as a "reunification movement," Saejowi continues to operate by advocating Korean reunification as well as the human rights of the North Korean people.

Reunification coordinator school
The educational opportunities provided by Saejowi are intended to facilitate improved relationships between North Korean defectors and South Koreans. In 2014, Saejowi hosted the"Reunification Coordinator School"(통일 코디네이터 학교) program, where approximately fifteen South Koreans and fifteen North Korean defectors met together on a weekly basis to discuss what needs to happen before North and South Korea can effectively reunify. The North Korean defectors in this program offered insights into what South Korea could do better to more effectively accommodate the needs of the North Korean population.

Performances

In November 2014 Saejowi co-sponsored the performance "The Story of Those Who Left" with the Seoul Foundation for Arts and Culture. This was a modern dance performance aimed at expressing the human will to survive. The Promise Team from Berlin, Germany, adapted and performed the stories of four North Korean women and highlighted their ability to discover a new life despite the difficulties and challenges they had previously faced. This performance provided the participating North Korean women with an opportunity to share their stories through an artistic medium.

On December 29, 2014, Dr. Shin Mi-nyeo of Saejowi and Prof. Kim Young-soo, professor at Sogang University's Political Science Department, performed nine songs from their new album, which features music focused on the emotions surrounding the division of the Korean peninsula. The songs were produced in collaboration with Seo Seung-il, a popular composer in South Korea.

Research activities
In recent years Saejowi has increased its focus on researching the problems surrounding defection from North Korea. While the organization emphasizes analyzing medical trends in the North Korean defector community in South Korea, it has also partnered with other research foundations in order to further research on how Korean reunification may impact North Korean defectors and the larger North Korean population. Saejowi also disseminates information and primary sources regarding defectors through various publications and forums in an effort to counteract discrimination against refugees.

International Policy Forum

As part of its 25th anniversary, Saejowi co-hosted a conference with the Hanns Seidel Foundation on June 4, 2013. The forum focused on how the West German government adapted to the flow of refugees from East Germany into West Germany between 1945 and the fall of the Berlin Wall. The role of civil society and non-governmental organizations in the German reunification process was also discussed, as well as the lessons applicable in the Korean context.

Letters to North Korea
Since 2004 Saejowi has been collecting letters written by North Korean defectors back home to North Korea. Because letters posted from South Korea are not deliverable in North Korea, the letters are never sent; however, the defectors have given permission for the publication of the letters on an annual basis. Saejowi recently completed an English translation of forty of these letters and is planning to publish the collection in 2015 with the title "Under the Apricot Tree." These letters provide insight into the inner thoughts of refugees before and after they leave North Korea.

Partners
 Community Chest of Korea
 Hanns Seidel Foundation
 Korea Hana Foundation
 Seoul Foundation for Arts and Culture
 South Korean Ministry of Gender Equality and Family
 South Korean Ministry of Security and Public Administration
 South Korean Ministry of Unification

References 

1988 establishments in South Korea
Organizations based in Seoul
North Korean defectors
Korean migration
Non-profit organizations based in South Korea
Human rights in North Korea
Organizations specializing in North Korean issues